Lecidea streveleri is a species of crustose lichen in the family Lecideaceae. Found in Canada and the United States, it was described as a new species in 2020 by lichenologist Toby Spribille. The type specimen was collected in the Hoonah-Angoon Census Area of Glacier Bay National Park (Alaska). Here it was on steep slopes in a basin on the west side of Dundas Bay, growing on the bark of an alder tree. The specific epithet streveleri honors Dr. Gregory P. Streveler, who, according to Spribille, is "an extraordinary naturalist and polymath, and author of numerous scientific papers, who has dedicated much of his life to understanding the natural history of Glacier Bay".

Lecidea streveleri grows on the bark of alder and balsam poplar. It is known to occur in Alaska as well as Haida Gwaii, British Columbia.

See also
List of Lecidea species

References

Lecideales
Lichen species
Lichens described in 2020
Lichens of Western Canada
Lichens of Subarctic America
Taxa named by Toby Spribille
Fungi without expected TNC conservation status